Georges Nicolas Djone (born 30 January 1982) is a Cameroonian former professional footballer who played as a midfielder. He played for Persis Solo in the Liga Indonesia Premier Division (LI).

References

External links

1982 births
Association football midfielders
Cameroonian expatriate footballers
Cameroonian expatriate sportspeople in Indonesia
Cameroonian footballers
Expatriate footballers in Indonesia
Liga 1 (Indonesia) players
Living people
Persis Solo players
Persita Tangerang players